RAI – Radiotelevisione italiana (commercially styled as Rai since 2000; known until 1954 as Radio Audizioni Italiane) is the national public broadcasting company of Italy, owned by the Ministry of Economy and Finance. RAI operates many terrestrial and subscription television channels and radio stations. It is one of the biggest broadcasters in Italy competing with Mediaset, and other minor radio and television networks. RAI has a relatively high television audience share of 35.9%.

RAI broadcasts are also received in surrounding countries, including Albania, Bosnia, Croatia, France, Malta, Monaco, Montenegro, San Marino, Slovenia, Switzerland, Serbia, Tunisia and the Vatican City, and elsewhere on pay television and some channels FTA across Europe including UK on the Hotbird satellite. Half of RAI's revenues come from broadcast receiving licence fees, the remainder from the sale of advertising time. In 1950, RAI became one of the 23 founding members of the European Broadcasting Union.

Structure 
RAI is 99% owned by the Italian Government Ministry of Economy and Finance and is the sole licensee (Concessionaria in esclusiva) of the radio, television, and multimedia broadcasting public service. For this reason, the agreement with the Government prescribes a series of rules and guarantees that Rai must follow to ensure fair public service to the citizens.

Management and Board of Directors are elected by the ruling Parliament through the Commissione parlamentare per l'indirizzo generale e la vigilanza dei servizi radiotelevisivi (Parliamentary Commission for the General Direction and Supervision of Broadcasting Services) every three years, in agreement with almost all Parliamentary exponents, usually following the political side of the majority and leaving some space for minor roles to minority parties exponents. 
Rai is formally a private joint-stock company (società per azioni) (although all stocks are state-owned) its company statute precisely describes how the strict relationship with the Republic is, also ruled by different national laws (the most recent one is the 2015 "Riforma della Rai", i.e. the 2015 law n.220.), including the "Testo Unico della Radiotelevisione" (roughly Consolidated Law on Radio and Television).

Rai and broadcasting are supervised by the commission, which rules also economic budgets and main regulations (including public service's electoral segments during electoral campaigns).

History

1924 
Unione Radiofonica Italiana (URI) was formed in 1924 with the backing of the Marconi Company following a model adopted in other European countries. URI made its inaugural broadcast — a speech by Benito Mussolini (1883–1945) at Teatro Costanzi — on 5 October. Regular programming began the following evening, with a quartet performing Haydn's Quartet No. 7 in A major from the Palazzo Corradi. At 21.00 CET, Ines Donarelli Viviani announced for the first time: "URI—Unione Radiofonica Italiana Rome station 1RO 425 metres wavelength. To all those who are listening our greetings, good evening". Guglielmo Marconi's S.A. Radiofono—Società Italiana per le Radiocomunicazioni Circolari (Radiofono) held 85% of URI shares and Western Electric's Società Italiana Radio Audizioni Circolari (SIRAC) held the remaining 15%.

Under the provisions of Royal Decree No. 1067 of 8 February 1923, wireless broadcasting became a state monopoly under the control of the Ministry of Posts and Telegraphs; URI was commissioned to provide services for a minimum of six years pursuant to Royal Decree No. 2191 of 14 October 1924 "Concessione dei servizi radioauditivi circolari alla Società Anonima Unione Radiofonica Italiana". However, when URI's contract expired in 1927, it was succeeded under Royal Decree Law No. 2207 of 17 November 1927 by the partially nationalised Ente Italiano per le Audizioni Radiofoniche (EIAR), which became Radio Audizioni Italiane S.p.A. (RAI) with investment from Società Idroelettrica Piemontese (SIP) in 1944.

1940s
During the reconstruction following World War II, much of RAI's early programming was influenced by the "Reithian" style of the BBC. The emphasis was on educational content. Programs like Non è mai troppo tardi and Un Viaggio al Po introduced people to what life was like in other parts of the country, at a time when most people could not afford to travel.

Over the following years, the RAI made various changes to its services. It reorganized its radio stations in November 1946 into two national networks, Rete Rossa and Rete Azzurra ("Red Network" and "Blue Network"). It added the culture-based Terzo Programma in October 1950. On 1 January 1952 the Rete Rossa became the Programma Nazionale (focusing on informational content) and the Rete Azzurra became the Secondo Programma (with a greater emphasis on entertainment). The three radio channels eventually became today's Rai Radio 1, Rai Radio 2, and Rai Radio 3.

1950s
In 1954 the state-owned holding company Istituto per la Ricostruzione Industriale (IRI) became the sole shareholder and URI – now renamed RAI—Radiotelevisione italiana to reflect its extended responsibilities – finally began a regular television service. On 3 January at 11.00 CET, the first RAI television announcer presented the day's schedule, which was broadcast from the service's Milan headquarters and relay stations in Turin and Rome. At 14.30, the first regular programme in Italian television history was broadcast: Arrivi e partenze, hosted by Armando Pizzo and Mike Bongiorno. The evening's entertainment was a theatre performance, L'osteria della posta, written by Carlo Goldoni. 23.15 saw the start of the day's concluding programme, La Domenica Sportiva – the first edition of a weekly series which continues to this day.

2000s 
RAI was originally the subsidiary of RAI Holding S.p.A. RAI Holding was absorbed into RAI
as of 1 December 2004, per Article 21 of Law 112/04.

The RAI is governed by a nine-member Administrative Council. Seven of the members are elected by a committee of the Italian Parliament. The other two (one of which is the President) are nominated by the largest shareholder: the Ministry of Economic Development. The Council appoints the Director-General. The Director-General and the members of the Administrative Council are appointed for a renewable three-year term.
In 2005, the government of Silvio Berlusconi proposed partial privatisation of RAI by 
selling 20% ownership. This proposal was very controversial, in part because Berlusconi was the head of the leading private broadcaster Mediaset. Some critics claimed that Mediaset could become the buyer and thus increase its dominant position. However, after the revelation that RAI would lose €80m ($96m, £54m) in 2006, the privatisation plan was suspended in October 2005.

2010s 
On 18 May 2010, Raisat received a major upgrade and re-branded with a new logo and a new name. It and all of the sister channels dropped the sat part from the name and became Rai YoYo, Rai 5 (formerly known as Rai Extra), Rai Premium, and Rai Movie (formerly known as Raisat Cinema).

On 11 June 2013, RAI was one of the few European broadcasters to condemn and criticize the closure of Greece's state broadcaster ERT.

RAI is 99% owned by the Italian Government Ministry of Economy and Finance, so it is said that it broadcasts content that may politically influence people.

Corporate identity 

The Alberto Ribera logo was introduced in 1967, however, this did not have significant application except on studios and portable cameras. A second variation of the Carboni logo was introduced in 1977, which was not officially adopted but appeared in some graphics, including that of the time signal.

Controversy

Political fairness and balance between public service and commercial TV market
Rai's broadcasts content and nominees are frequently accused of political influences, depending both on the nominated management for every channel or news programme, and on the lack of meritocracy in contracts with television personalities, hosts and also technicians, also concerting cachets and salaries. However, many people trying to underline that Rai need to balance political equity and public services with the market rules and competitors. All these issues are still pending and unsolved.

Rai's main channels are culturally considered slightly politically oriented: Rai 1 is liberal or right-centred, Rai 2 is usually more right-oriented, while Rai 3 is typically considered leftist, having the majority of left oriented programmes and hosts Fabio Fazio, Bianca Berlinguer, or the journalistic deep investigation programme Report, famous for its investigations over far-right scandals. This issue in Italy is referred as "lottizzazione" and is yet to be solved.

Political censorship and civil rights advocacy controversies 
Rai is frequently subjected to controversies and censorship accusations regarding political matters, especially civil rights and LGBT issues.

The broadcaster was strongly accused in 2008 of cutting the gay love scene of the Oscar-winning movie Brokeback Mountain. Rai initially apologized for the cut, explaining that the cut was due to a pre-cut edition originally planned for the prime-time slot, and wasn't corrected when airing was shifted to the late-night slot.  Critics noticed that similar scenes of heterosexual lovers were never cut out before in prime-time and reinforcing the accusation of homophobic censorship. 
The company rescheduled a new uncut version of the movie, but this was aired again in an even later time slot, a choice seen as a confirmation of the accusation. Only two years later, the movie aired again with all homosexual sex and kisses cut off. Rai was forced again to apologise, accusing a problem" with the pre-cut edition by the distribution company and a lack of fact-checking by the Rai employee.

In 2011, episode 125 of the German TV Soap Um Himmels Willen (literally "For Heaven's Sake"), shown in Italy since 2004, was entitled Romeo and Romeo and due to screen on Rai 1 but was left out in order to "avoid controversy", according to the broadcaster.

In 2016, during the first clear broadcast of the show How to Get Away with Murder, on Rai 2, the gay kisses for one of the main characters (portrayed by Jack Falahee) were completely cut off. Rai apologized again, stating that the incident was "merely the mistake of an overzealous editor". Criticism on the social media platforms was so strong that Falahee and showrunner Shonda Rhimes both tweeted against the network "inexcusable" censorship.

Fedez controversy
In 2021, another accusation was made against Rai by famous Italian rapper and Chiara Ferragni's husband Fedez. During the "Concertone del 1 Maggio", a traditional Italian TV broadcast concert in celebration of the International Workers' Day, the rapper was invited to perform and have a speech on the stage. The rapper honored the entertainment workers affected by the COVID-19 pandemic and spent half of his speech in support of legislation that would punish violence against women and LGBT people as hate crimes in Italy. During his speech he recalled all the political exponents' hate speech (confirmed by videos or sentenced by court) during the late years and accused Rai 3's executive of trying censoring his speech by order of "superiors" as "this is how it works." Rai immediately denied all accusations and Fedez leaked a recorded audio of the conversation between him and the executives, where managers and hosts (declaring their names and roles to him) tried to censor his speech, by "asking you to adapt to a system that you probably don't get".

After the video was reposted by all national media and web news sites, Rai sued the rapper, while a parliamentary investigation was opened. Fedez replied he was proud and ready to face the court, and he said he was available as a testimony for the Rai's Superior Commission. Fedez's accusation was one of the biggest media scandals of Rai, as not only all political parties took sides in the cause (centre and left in favor of the Rapper, including ex-prime ministers Giuseppe Conte and Enrico Letta, while right and far-right parties in favor of Rai, including Matteo Salvini and Giorgia Meloni's colleagues), but also because Fedez and his wife, fashion blogger Chiara Ferragni are the most followed Italians on social media and are very active in social causes and civil rights advocating.

The scandal increased when the parliamentary commission denied a hearing with Fedez, only speaking with Rai's executives. In the very much criticized email answer (which screenshot was published by Fedez on Instagram) the Office of the Commission stated that even if not prohibited by law, it was not custom to invite external people to the Commission investigation. Fedez replied to the email with only three clown emojis, a fact that further angered the far-right politicians.

In July, the new board of Rai was elected, including the CEO and executives; this led to Rai's CEO Fuortes revealing not only the withdrawal of the action in court for failing all the required accusatory elements but also that no legal action was ever meant by the new management. Far-right exponents opened a parliamentary question over the withdrawal. After the CEO's declaration, no other details were said about any apology or agreement with Fedez: nonetheless, the rapper was invited by Fabio Fazio to the first episode of the new season of his late show.

Following the 2021 controversy, Fedez reinforced some controversy against Rai when he announced he wasn't invited to the 2022 Concertone for the first time.

Budget and unjustified expenses 
Rai was investigated and fined (with many executives arrested or fired) for unjustified expenses and suspicious gifts. It was noticed that, frequently, dinners, expensive watches and jewellery were all paid by Rai for unknown people outside the company.

In 2022, a new scandal was investigated by the Guardia di Finanza surrounding corruption and bribes. At least 5 people in total were arrested, while the investigation is still ongoing.

TV channels

Current channels

In high definition and ultra definition

Due to the broadcasting rights of the free-to-air satellite channels Rai 1, Rai 2, Rai 3 and Rai Sport in some programs, broadcasts outside Italy are encrypted. In particular, it takes part in copyrighted programs (mostly foreign productions) and international sports competitions. In the past, it was encrypted as Discrete in analog satellite television broadcasts due to broadcasting rights outside Italy. Rai channels will not be broadcast due to broadcasting rights on digital platforms outside Italy.

International

Regional

Discontinued channels 
 Rai Azzurri: UEFA Euro 2004 (2004, broadcast using Rai Utile frequencies)
 Rai Doc: cultures, styles (1 April 2004 – 1 June 2007)
 Rai Extra: generalist (31 July 2003 – 26 November 2010)
 Rai Festival (broadcast using Rai Utile frequencies)
 Rai Futura: technologies, video games, etc. (30 May 2005 – 1 February 2007, broadcast on the same frequences of Rai Doc at settled times)
 Rai HD (22 April 2008 – 18 September 2016)
 Rai Med (26 April 2001 – April 2014)
 Rai Olimpia: 2004 Summer Olympics (2004, broadcast using Rai Utile frequencies)
 Rai Sport 2 (18 May 2010 – 5 February 2017)
 Rai Sport 2 HD (1 August – 19 September 2016, HD version launched for 2016 Olympic and Paralympic Games)
 Rai UniNettuno Sat Uno (1998 – April 2014)
  (2003 – 1 February 2009)
 Rai Utile (4 January 2004 – 1 January 2008)
 Rai Widescreen: 1998 FIFA World Cup (1998–1999)
 Rai On Cultura (IPTV)
 Rai On Fiction (IPTV)
 Rai On Fiction Live (IPTV)
 Rai On News (IPTV)
 Rai On Ragazzi (IPTV)
 Rai On Spettacolo (IPTV)
 Rai On Sport (IPTV)
  (1997–1999)
  (1997–1999)
  or Rai Educational Sat (1997–2000)
  (1 June 1999 – 30 July 2003)
  (1999 – 30 July 2003)
  (2000 – 30 July 2003)
 RaiSat Gambero Rosso Channel (1999 – 31 July 2009)
  (1 July 1999 – 31 October 2006)
  (1 June 1999 – 31 July 2003)
  (1 November 2006 – 1 August 2009)
 Salute! (2009–2010)
  (2009–2012)

Radio stations

Current stations
On FM, AM, Satellite, DAB/DAB+, DTT, Filodiffusion, Web:
 Rai Radio 1: news and sports
 Rai Radio 2: adult contemporary music and talk shows
 Rai Radio 3: classical music and culture
 Rai Radio 3 Classica: classic and opera music
 Rai Gr Parlamento: coverage of proceedings in the Italian Parliament
 Rai Isoradio: for motorway users

Regional stations:
 Rai Südtirol: German-language programmes for the Trentino-Alto Adige/Südtirol region
 Rai Radio Trst A: Slovene-language programmes for the Friuli-Venezia Giulia/Furlanija Julijska Krajina region
 : Italian, Friulian and Slovene language programmes; as Rai Friûl Vignesie Julie (in Friulian) and Rai Furlanija Julijska Krajina (in Slovenian)

Only on Satellite, DAB/DAB+, DTT, Filodiffusion and Web:
 Rai Radio Tutta Italiana: only Italian music
 : featuring items from the radio archives
 : live music
 : station for children from 2 to 10 years old
 : sports
 No Name Radio: independent music

Discontinued stations 
  (1982 — 1991)
  (1982 — 1991)
  (1982 — 1995)
  (1991 — 1994)
  (1991 — 1994)
 Rai Italia Radio (1 July 1930 — 31 December 2011)
  (1952 — 2011) 
 Radio Rai Sport
 Rai Radio 8 Opera (6 August 2015 — 11 June 2017)
 Rai Radio Indie (first Rai Radio 2 Indie; 18 June 2018 — 16 December 2022)

Divisions and subsidiaries
 (Rai Structures) is a news organization internal to Rai, or rather an internal management and division, created in order to independently manage the programs broadcast on the generalist and, in particular, thematic networks. After 2000, Rai reorganized its corporate structure with the creation of specific structures, listed here:
Rai Cultura (previously Rai Educational or Rai Edu): operates event and documentary channels
Rai Documentari: documentary productions
Rai Expo: supporting and making the public aware of the Expo 2015 event in Milan
Rai Fiction: production company for feature films, TV films etc.
: the radio newsroom
: management of thematic channels dedicated to cinema and television series
Rai Kids: children's programming and production company
: weather forecasts and reports
: production of news and information services such as Televideo (teletext)
 (1996–2012): overnight TV programming on Rai 1, 2 and 3
: operates the Rai Gr Parlamento, Senato della Repubblica and Camera dei deputati channels
: transmits broadcasts from the President's Quirinale Palace
: production of radio programs, generally in Rome, and management for the radio division
: production of live coverage of sporting events on the three generalist channels (Rai 1, Rai 2, Rai 3) and its own channel of the same name
Rai Teche: the broadcast archives
: transmits broadcasts from the Vatican
: production and broadcast of major events
TG1: production of news and information services on Rai 1
TG2: production of news and information services on Rai 2
TG3: production of news and information services on Rai 3
TGR: production of local news and information regional services on Rai 3

Related companies
 (1998–): film production company
01 Distribution (2000–): film distributor
 (2000–2009): television programs on demand, later replaced by  
 (2015–): promotes the marketing rights of the productions
 (1926–): advertising agency
 (1960–2012): production, distribution and marketing in the United States
 (1987–2012)
 (1999–2014): managed the web portals from the rai.it and rai.tv domains
RaiSat (1997–2010): subsidiary created to produce thematic TV channels for satellite television
 (1987–2011): promoted the marketing rights of the productions
 (2011–14), previously  (1995–2011): radio and television distribution abroad, operated Rai Italia
Rai Way (1999–): broadcasting network for the distribution of the broadcast signal
 (1955–1997): television rights management and marketing

Other services
: broadcasts television and radio programs throughout the territory of Alto Adige and Trentino
Rai Libri: magazine and broadcast publisher
Rai Orchestra: the broadcaster's radio orchestra 
RaiPlay: multimedia platform

: produces and broadcasts radio and television programs in Italian and French on the territory of the Aosta Valley. There are also broadcasts in the Valdôtain dialect.

Rai Libri 

Rai Libri is the print publishing arm of Rai, headquartered in Turin. They primarily publish magazines and periodicals for news, entertainment, the broadcast industry, and since their beginning, broadcast schedules.

Publishing history 
RAI's history in print with the Unione Radiofonica Italiana (URI)'s weekly magazine Radio Orario which debuted in January 1925 and became Radiocorriere in 1930. Edizioni Radio Italiana (ERI) was founded in 1949 in Turin, formed entirely from RAI capital to build on Radiocorriere's success. In 1954 primary ownership was split between RAI and Istituto per la Ricostruzione Industriale (IRI). That same year Radiocorriere became Radiocorriere TV, which would continue to be published until RAI divested in 1995.

The 80s saw the premiere of the monthlies Moda (1983) and King (1987), along with registering a new company name in 1987: Nuova Eri Edizioni Rai-Radiotelevisione Italiana S.p.A., or "Nuova ERI".

Since the 90s RAI/ERI has increasingly focused on publishing books written by its own broadcast stars, both in news and entertainment. In 1995 Nuova ERI closed and reopened in 1997 as "Rai Eri". On 15 October 2018, they renamed to "Rai Libri".

Rai Libri also edits technical publications: Elettronica e telecomunicazioni since 1946, Nuova rivista musicale italiana since 1967, and Nuova civiltà delle macchine since 1957. It produces its own reports on communications and media, with the second edition of the book-and-documentary RicordeRai released in 2004 in collaboration with Rai Teche.

Radiocorriere TV 

RAI (originally URI) had printed its broadcast schedules nearly without interruption starting in 1925 as Radio Orario, then from 1930 as Radiocorriere, then continuously from 1954 as Radiocorriere TV, until RAI divested in 1995.

The magazine was restarted under publisher  with a print edition from 1999 to 2008, closing due to poor sales. It reopened in 2012 as an online-only publication, with a handful of special-occasion independent print runs in the intervening years, including 2005 (its 80th anniversary), 2010 (switchover to DTTV), and 2011 (150th anniversary of the unification of Italy). The "Rai Ufficio Stampa [press office]" website has meanwhile published programming schedules and television blurbs online since 2011 under the magazine's name. On 3 January 2014, Rai Teche published online the complete 1925–1995 archives of URI/RAI's Radio Orario/Radiocorriere/TV.

Headquarters and offices

Local offices
 North-West: Genoa, Saint Christophe
 North-East: Bologna, Bolzano, Trento, Trieste, Venice
 Centre: Ancona, Florence, Perugia, Pescara
 South: Bari, Campobasso, Cosenza, Potenza
 Islands: Cagliari, Palermo

Foreign offices
There are RAI offices in foreign countries, which produce news reports that are broadcast live in Italy. These offices are in: Brussels, Paris, Berlin, London, New York City, Beijing, Cairo, Jerusalem, Nairobi, Moscow, Rio de Janeiro, and Bangkok.

Finances

Debt level
As March 2015, the RAI has a debt of 442 million and the Italian Court of Audit was worried about the size of RAI's debt for the impact that this may have on Italian people, as the company is owned by the state.

Mandatory annual fee on all televisions in Italy 
Italians must purchase an annual television licence for about €90 every year in order to legally own a TV or HDTV. It is known as Canone Rai, "Rai Tax" because it is used to part-fund the RAI. Since 2016, it is financed through the electricity bill.

See also
 Television in Italy
 Television licensing in Italy
 Prix Italia

References

External links

Rai.it
RaiPlay
Live Radio
Rai Expo official multilanguage site, a library of about 1000 videos exploring and explaining "Expo di Milano 2015" theme

1924 establishments in Italy
Mass media companies established in 1924
European Broadcasting Union members
Government-owned companies of Italy
Italian brands
Italian-language television networks
Multilingual broadcasters
Publicly funded broadcasters
 
Television channels and stations established in 1954